The following is a list of massacres that have occurred in Palestine since January 2013.

For massacres that took place in classical Judea, see List of massacres in Roman Judea. 
For massacres that took place prior to the British Mandate, see List of massacres in Ottoman Syria.
For massacres that took place in the British Mandate for Palestine, see List of killings and massacres in Mandatory Palestine. 
For massacres that took place during the 1948 Palestine War, see Killings and massacres during the 1948 Palestine War. 
 For massacres that have occurred in Israel following its declaration of independence, see List of massacres in Israel. 
 For massacres that have occurred in the West Bank and the Gaza Strip since 1994, see List of massacres in Palestinian Territories.

See also

List of massacres in Syria

References

Massacres
Palestine
Palestine